The 2010 Beijing International Challenge (also known as the 2010 BTV Cup) was a professional non-ranking snooker tournament that took place between 19 and 25 July 2010 at the Beijing University Students' Gymnasium in Beijing, China.

Tian Pengfei won the title by defeating Ryan Day 9–3 in the final.

Prize fund
The breakdown of prize money for this year is shown below:
Winner: £40,000
Runner-up: £19,500
Semi-final: £7,500
Highest break: £2,500
Maximum break: Hyundai Sedan

Main draw

Round-robin stage

Group A

Table

Results:
 Ali Carter 5–4 Liang Wenbo
 Mark Allen 3–5 Xiao Guodong
 Ryan Day 3–5 Ali Carter
 Liang Wenbo 5–2 Xiao Guodong
 Mark Allen 5–3 Ali Carter
 Liang Wenbo 4–5 Ryan Day
 Mark Allen 4–5 Ryan Day
 Ali Carter 4–5 Xiao Guodong
 Liang Wenbo 5–3 Mark Allen
 Ryan Day 5–2 Xiao Guodong

Group B

Table

Results:
 Stephen Hendry 2–5 Tian Pengfei
 Stephen Maguire 5–1 Jin Long
 Marco Fu 5–4 Stephen Hendry
 Stephen Maguire 3–5 Tian Pengfei
 Marco Fu 4–5 Tian Pengfei
 Stephen Hendry 2–5 Jin Long
 Marco Fu 5–4 Jin Long
 Stephen Maguire 4–5 Stephen Hendry
 Tian Pengfei 1–5 Jin Long
 Stephen Maguire 5–2 Marco Fu

Knock-out stage

Qualifying
The qualifying tournament for the Beijing International Challenge (also known as the 2010 Chinese Classic) took place  between 16 and 18 July 2010 at the Beijing University Students' Gymnasium, in Beijing, China.

Round-robin stage

Group A

Table

Results:
 Li Hang 1–4 Zhang Anda
 Tian Pengfei 4–2 Li Hang
 Tian Pengfei 2–4 Zhang Anda

Group B

Table

Results:
 Li Yan 1–4 Jin Long
 Jin Long 2–4 Xiao Guodong
 Xiao Guodong 1–4 Li Yan

Knock-out stage

Century breaks

Main stage centuries
 140, 110, 108, 105, 100  Liang Wenbo
 137, 107, 107, 103, 102  Mark Allen
 136, 136, 111  Marco Fu
 133, 100  Tian Pengfei
 120, 116, 116, 105  Stephen Maguire
 114, 106, 102  Ryan Day
 114  Ali Carter
 107, 100  Jin Long
 100  Stephen Hendry

Qualifying stage centuries
 119  Xiao Guodong
 114, 107  Jin Long
 113  Li Yan
 103  Zhang Anda

References

2010
Beijing International Challenge
Beijing International Challenge